Kanavalli  is a village in the southern state of Karnataka, India. It is located in the Haveri taluk of Haveri district in Karnataka. It is 17 kilometers from Haveri city

Demographics
 India census, Kanavalli had a population of 6262 with 3284 males and 2978 females.

Transport
Buses are available from Haveri. There are 2 ways to reach kanavalli
1. Via Yattinhalli, Agadi, Shibar
2. Via Kallihal, Katenhalli, Hanumanahalli

Kanavalli is known for Parameshwara temple yearly jathra celebration and Dyamavva Temple Devti celebrated 3 yearly. Next Devti celebration is in 2013.

See also
 Haveri
 Districts of Karnataka

References

External links
 http://Haveri.nic.in/

Villages in Haveri district